Tentax bruneii is a moth of the family Erebidae first described by Michael Fibiger in 2011. It is found in Brunei.

The wingspan is about 9.5 mm. The head, labial palps, patagia, prothorax, and forewings (including fringes) are beige, with a brown terminal area. The basal costal patch on the forewing and upper quadrangular medial area are black brown. The crosslines are indistinct and light brown, except for the brown terminal line. The hindwings are light grey. The underside of the forewings is light brown and the underside of the hindwings is grey with a discal spot.

The only known specimen was collected by day in a lowland forest.

References

Micronoctuini
Taxa named by Michael Fibiger
Moths described in 2011